Lucinasco is a comune (municipality) in the Province of Imperia in the Italian region Liguria, located about  southwest of Genoa and about  northwest of Imperia.

The municipality of Lucinasco contains the frazione (subdivision) Borgoratto.

Lucinasco borders the following municipalities: Borgomaro, Chiusanico, Chiusavecchia, Pontedassio, and Vasia.

Demographic evolution

References

Cities and towns in Liguria